Magnetic Feel is an album by organist Jack McDuff recorded in 1975 and released on the Cadet label.

Track listing 
All compositions by Jack McDuff except as indicated
 "Blue Monsoon" (Esmond Edwards) - 6:05   
 "Don't Mess With Mr. T" (Marvin Gaye) - 6:30   
 "A Long Goodie" - 5:05   
 "Won't You Try My Love" - 4:36   
 "Black Jack" - 8:20   
 "Magnetic Feel" - 6:29

Personnel 
Jack McDuff - organ, electric piano, synthesizer, piano 
Pee Wee Ellis - alto saxophone, tenor saxophone
Phil Upchurch - guitar
George Benson - guitar, drums
Cornell Dupree - rhythm guitar
Bob Cranshaw - electric bass
Grady Tate - drums
Ray Mantilla - congas, percussion

References 

 

Jack McDuff albums
1975 albums
Cadet Records albums
Albums produced by Esmond Edwards